Katie McCarthy may refer to:

Katie McCarthy, character in All Good Things (film)
Katie McCarthy, character in Deceit played by Emily Barclay
Catherine McCarthy, producer of Fossil Detectives

See also
Kate McCarthy (disambiguation)